Puozaa Mathias Asuma is a Ghanaian politician and member of the 6th Parliament of the 4th Republic of Ghana representing Daffiama/Bussie/Issa constituency of Upper West Region of Ghana.

Early life and education 
Asuma was born on 10 January 1948. He is an indegene of Touri-Daffiama, a town in the Upper West Region of Ghana. He is an alumnus of University of Edinburgh, Scotland where he obtained his Master of Science degree in Community Education.

Personal life 
Asuma is married with five children. He is a Catholic Christian.

Career and politics 
Puozaa is an educationist. He started his career as a lecturer at the prestigious University of Ghana Legon, Accra before he became a member of the parliament. He was first elected into office in the 2004 Ghanaian General Elections and became member of the Parliament in January 2005  with the ticket of the National Democratic Congress. He had a run of 3 terms in office afterwards and left office in January 2017. While in parliament, he was the Chairman of the Parliamentary Select Committee on Education.

References 

1948 births
People from Upper West Region
Alumni of the University of Edinburgh
Living people
Ghanaian MPs 2005–2009
Ghanaian MPs 2009–2013
Ghanaian MPs 2013–2017